Sabine Ellerbrock defeated Jiske Griffioen in the final, 6–3, 3–6, 6–1 to win the women's singles wheelchair tennis title at the 2013 French Open.

Esther Vergeer was the six-time reigning champion, but retired from professional wheelchair tennis in February 2013. Since Vergeer had won every edition of the event since its creation in 2007, a new French Open singles champion was guaranteed.

Seeds
  Aniek van Koot (semifinals)
  Jiske Griffioen (final)

Draw

Finals

References
 Draw

Wheelchair Women's Singles
French Open, 2013 Women's Singles